The Houston Aeros were a professional ice hockey team in the World Hockey Association (WHA) from 1972 to 1978.

Franchise history
The Aeros were originally slated to play in Dayton, Ohio, as a charter member of the WHA.  However, Dayton residents were indifferent at best to a WHA team, and while there were questions regarding whether a U.S. market with less than a million people and a stagnating economy would support a major league hockey franchise in the long term, the more critical short-term problem was that Dayton did not have a suitable arena.  The largest arena in the city, the University of Dayton Arena, did not have an ice plant and the university balked at the cost of installing one. The largest hockey venue, Hara Arena, seated only 5,000 people—not enough even for temporary use. Due to these problems, owner Paul Deneau moved the team to Houston, Texas. Although the Aeros name had originally been chosen in honor of the Wright brothers, it was deemed appropriate for Houston given the importance of the space industry.

In Houston, the Aeros became one of the most successful franchises in the WHA.  They won four consecutive Western Division titles, from 1973–74 to 1976–77 seasons, and finished second in the Western Division in 1972–73 and third in the league in 1977–78. They won the AVCO World Trophy in 1974 over the Chicago Cougars and in 1975 over the Quebec Nordiques, winning both series in four-game sweeps; and lost in the 1976 AVCO finals to the Winnipeg Jets, also in a sweep. 

In 1977, John Ziegler became president of the WHA's established rival, the National Hockey League, and shortly thereafter, initiated the first serious merger discussions with the WHA. Houston, along with Cincinnati, Winnipeg, New England, Quebec, and Edmonton applied for entry into the NHL. After a lengthy debate, NHL owners voted the proposal down.

Merger discussions resumed in 1978, and it again appeared that the Aeros, as one of the league's strongest teams, were an obvious candidate to join the NHL. Unfortunately for Houston, by this time Ziegler realized NHL owners would never vote to admit six teams and floated a proposal that would admit four WHA franchises. The WHA responded by insisting that all three of its Canadian teams be included in the merger. This left room for only one American team. The Aeros and Whalers were the only serious contenders, as they were the most stable of the American teams. Aeros owner Kenneth Schnitzer attempted to persuade Boston Bruins owner Jeremy Jacobs to support a merger that included the Aeros and not the Hartford-based Whalers. However, Jacobs, as one of the older league's most hard-line owners, was opposed to any sort of merger with the WHA. In any event, Ziegler was cool to the idea of adding another Sun Belt NHL team. Of the three Sun Belt teams that had joined the league since 1967, one (the California Golden Seals) had already relocated and another, the Atlanta Flames) were struggling financially. The Flames, as it turned out, would move to Calgary two years later. 

During the final series of talks, it soon became evident that no merger of any sort would take place in time for the 1978-79 NHL season. It was also apparent that when there was a merger, the Aeros were not likely to be included. Schnitzer announced that the Aeros would not take part in the 1978-79 WHA season. He first applied for direct admission to the NHL, only to find the older league uninterested in such an expansion with so many of its existing franchises struggling. Finally, Schnitzer campaigned to be allowed to purchase an existing club and relocate it to Houston. The obvious candidate to move was the Cleveland Barons (the former Seals), who had barely survived the season and were on the verge of folding. Schnitzer believed the older league would accept almost any other proposal as an alternative to the perceived embarrassment of having to disband a franchise, and did come close to a deal to relocate the moribund Barons franchise to Houston. However, the NHL instead opted to approve a proposal from the owners of the Minnesota North Stars to buy the Barons  franchise and "merge" it with their own. Having run out of options, Schnitzer folded the Aeros on July 9, 1978. In doing so, the Aeros became the only WHA champion that did not eventually join the NHL.

Bill Dineen was the Aeros' head coach during their entire stay in the WHA. Among the players for the Aeros were Gordie Howe and his two sons Mark and Marty, who became the first father/son combination to play together in professional hockey. When Mark Howe retired as a member of the Detroit Red Wings (his father's old team) in 1995, he was the last member of the Houston Aeros to be playing in the NHL.

Season-by-season record
Note: GP = Games played, W = Wins, L = Losses, T = Ties, Pts = Points, GF = Goals for, GA = Goals against, PIM = Penalties in minutes

See also 
List of WHA seasons
Houston Aeros, the AHL franchise named after the original Aeros
List of Houston Aeros (WHA) players

References

External links 
Aeros All-Time Records on Hockey DB

Defunct ice hockey teams in Texas
Ice hockey clubs established in 1972
Sports clubs disestablished in 1978
World Hockey Association teams
Ice hockey teams in Houston
1972 establishments in Texas
1978 disestablishments in Texas